Yixin Diao is an electrical engineer at the IBM Watson Research Center in Yorktown Heights, New York, USA. He was named a Fellow of the Institute of Electrical and Electronics Engineers (IEEE) in 2016 for his contributions to modeling, optimization and control of computing systems.

References 

Fellow Members of the IEEE
Living people
Year of birth missing (living people)
American electrical engineers